Daspletosaurini is an extinct clade of tyrannosaurine dinosaurs that lived in Laramidia during the Late Cretaceous (Middle Campanian) period. It consists of two genera: Daspletosaurus and Thanatotheristes. Four species have been described in the two genera, namely Daspletosaurus torosus, Daspletosaurus horneri, Daspletosaurus wilsoni, and Thanatotheristes degrootorum. At one point all of them were assigned as specimens of D. torosus, but several papers since 2017 have found them to represent distinct species. These studies found anagenesis in the group, whether contained in a daspletosaurin clade or paraphyletic in respect to the lineage of tyrannosaurines leading up to Tyrannosaurus.

Description

Daspletosaurini is diagnosed by characteristics such as the presence of an extremely coarse subcutaneous surface of the maxilla anteroventral to the antorbital fossa; a constricted jugal ramus of maxilla; the anteroventral corner of the maxilla tapers into a shallow angle (<65°) as measured between the alveolar margin of the first two alveoli and the anterior margin of the subcutaneous surface; a prefrontal that is broad in dorsal view and strongly dorsomedially arced in anterior view; a dentary chin located ventral to either the third alveolus or third interdental plate and possessing no fewer than 14 maxillary teeth.

Classification
In the 2020 description of Thanatotheristes, Voris et al. erected Daspletosaurini as a new clade within Tyrannosauridae, as a sister taxon to a clade comprising Zhuchengtyrannus, Tarbosaurus, and Tyrannosaurus. The cladogram below shows the results of the phylogenetic analyses performed by Voris et al. (2020):

In 2022, Warshaw & Fowler proposed that the three Daspletosaurus species evolved through anagenesis in the Tyrannosaurinae in a line leading to Zhuchengtyrannus, Tarbosaurus, and Tyrannosaurus. Due to their more fragmentary nature, Thanatotheristes and Nanuqsaurus were excluded from this analysis. The cladogram below shows the results of the phylogenetic analysis performed by Warshaw & Fowler (2022).

References

Tyrannosaurs